Lights...Camera...Action! is a pinball machine designed by Jon Norris and released by Gottlieb in 1989. The game features a movie making show business theme.

Description
There are five movie scenes which need to be completed - the gunfight scene, the multiball scene, the stair scene, the jackpot scene, and the stunt scene.

Lights...Camera...Action! was pinball’s first mode based game. It is based on Gottlieb's system 3, since system 80B could not handle its demands. The design was originally a card game. The spinner draw card feature was retained, but the rest of the pinball machine rules were adapted rules from the cancelled pinball machine Red Alert.

The pinball machine has a mechanical backbox animation in which handguns raised in a draw. The mode starts when the ball falls in top hole. The player has to press the right flipper to beat the villain. At the top of the backbox are colored floodlights. The upper left of the playfield contains a rotating mini-playfield.

Digital versions
Lights...Camera...Action! is available as a licensed table of The Pinball Arcade for several platforms.

References

External links
 Internet Pinball Database entry for Lights...Camera...Action!

1989 pinball machines
Gottlieb pinball machines